Edward Morris also known as Ed Morris (born 1988) is an English male lawn bowler. He is a two times British champion and four times English champion and bowls for the Essex County Bowling Club.

Bowls career
Morris became the English champion when he won the two wood singles tournament, during the 2018 National Championships. He won a second National title during the 2019 Championships, when he won the singles title.

In 2021, he won a his third title during the 2021 Bowls England National Finals, when he won the triples with Christopher Muir and Steve Gunnell. Several days later he finished runner-up to Sam Tolchard in the two wood singles.

In July 2022, he represented England in the British Isles Bowls Championships held at Llandrindod Wells Bowling Club in both the singles and triples (with Christopher Muir and Steve Gunnell) going on to win both titles. Just two months later he won a fourth national title when sealing victory in the singles once again at the 2022 Bowls England National Finals.

References

Living people
English male bowls players
1988 births